The Tukipo River is a river of the southwest Hawke's Bay region of New Zealand's North Island. It flows east from its origins in the Ruahine Range to reach the Tukituki River five kilometres west of Waipukurau

See also
List of rivers of New Zealand

References

Rivers of the Hawke's Bay Region